Eursinge may refer to several villages in Drenthe, Netherlands:

 Eursinge, Midden-Drenthe
 Eursinge, De Wolden
 Eursinge, Westerveld

See also:
 Eursing, another town in Drenthe